Gandakasia is an extinct genus of ambulocetid from Pakistan, that lived in the Eocene epoch. It probably caught its prey near rivers or streams.

Just like Himalayacetus, Gandakasia is only known from a single jaw fragment, making comparisons to other ambulocetids difficult.

The first ambulocetid to be described, Gandakasia was not initially recognized as a cetacean.

Gandakasia probably inhabited a freshwater niche similar to the pakicetids.

References

Ambulocetidae
Prehistoric cetacean genera
Fossil taxa described in 1958
Extinct mammals of Asia